.br is the Internet country code top-level domain (ccTLD) for Brazil. It was administered by the Brazilian Internet Steering Committee until 2005 when it started being administered by Brazilian Network Information Center. A local contact is required for any registration. Registrations of domain names with Portuguese characters are also accepted.

With the exception of universities, the second-level domain is fixed and selected from a list that defines the category. Institutions of tertiary education were allowed to use the ccSLD , although some use  and others (mainly public universities) use . There are also some other few exceptions that were allowed to use the second level domain until the end of 2000. As of April 2010, most domain registrations ignore categories and register in the  domain, which has over 90% of all registered domains.

History 
Created and delegated to Brazil in 1989 by Jon Postel, initially the domain was operated manually by Registro.br and administered by the Fundação de Amparo à Pesquisa do Estado de São Paulo (FAPESP).  Originally, only researchers and institutions to which they belonged had the interest and ability to adopt the new system and register domains under .br.

At the time, networks prevalent in the Brazilian academic setting were the BITNET ("Because It's Time NETwork"), the HEPnet ("High Energy Physics Network") and the UUCP ("Unix-to-Unix Copy Program").  As such, even before Brazil officially connected to the Internet in 1991, the .br domain was used to identify the machines participating in networks already in use by academics.

In 1995 the Brazilian Internet Steering Committee (or simply CGI.br) was created with an objective to coordinate the allocation of Internet addresses (IPs) and the registration of .br domain names. There were 851 domains registered with the Brazilian DNS by the beginning of 1996, thereafter experiencing rapid growth with the mass arrival of companies, Internet providers and media onto the Internet. The registration system was automated in 1997 and was developed using open source software.

In 2005, CGI.br created its own executive arm, the Brazilian Network Information Center (or simply NIC.br), which currently serves in both administrative and operational capacity for the registry.

In 2017, accounts associated with DNS records of Brazilian banks were hacked. Kaspersky's researchers pointed out to a vulnerability in NIC.br's website and suggested its infrastructure had been compromised. NIC's director at the time, Frederico Neves, denied that NIC.br was "hacked", although NIC.br admitted the vulnerability.

Domain registry 
To register any domains under .br, it is necessary to enter into contact with Registro.br.  Entities legally established in Brazil as a company ("pessoa jurídica") or a physical person ("profissional liberal" and "pessoas físicas") that has a contact within Brazil can register domains. Foreign companies that have a power-of-attorney legally established in Brazil can also do it by following specific rules.

The registration of domains with special Portuguese characters (à, á, â, ã, é, ê, í, ó, ô, õ, ú, ü and ç) is accepted since 2005.

Syntactic rules for .br domains 
 Minimum of 2 and maximum of 26 characters, not including the category.  For example, in the field XXXX.COM.BR, this limitation relates to the XXXX.
 Valid characters are [A-Z, 0-9], the hyphen, and the following accented characters: à, á, â, ã, é, ê, í, ó, ô, õ, ú, ü, ç.
 Domains cannot contain only numbers.
 To maintain the integrity of the registry, Registro.br sets up an equivalence mapping to compare domain names with and without accented characters. The mapping is done by converting accented characters and the cedilla for their non-accented versions and "c", respectively, and discards hyphens. A new domain will only be allowed to be registered when there is no equivalent to a pre-existing domain, or when the applicant is the same entity that owns the domain equivalent.

Note: Specifically for the domain .NOM.BR, it is necessary to choose two names, i.e.: NAME1.NAME2.NOM.BR.

Usage statistics 

Second-level domains

Direct registration 
In 1991, it was decided that universities and research institutes would be allowed second-level .br domains directly. For example: Federal University of Rio de Janeiro got ufrj.br; University of São Paulo got usp.br; National Institute for Space Research got inpe.br; and so on.

In late 2000, the Brazilian Internet Steering Committee reported abuse in this system, and called for all institutions directly under .br to be moved to .edu.br – so, for example, ufrj.br would become ufrj.edu.br. During a meeting in early 2001, however, the Committee decided it would be of public interest to not move every second-level domain as to avoid confusion, but instead established rules regarding their registration:

 No longer accepting automatic registration of second-level domains, and evaluating every request for one individually;
 Creating edu.br, and forwarding requests from education and research institutions to it;
 Concession to education and research institutes that already had a second-level .br domain, as long as its usage is appropriate and that domain name is related to the institution's name or acronym. Domains approved are automatically duplicated under edu.br as well, and both may exist concurrently – for example, the still existing ufrj.br also has a registered ufrj.edu.br, although the latter is not used;
 Other institutions not approved above must be migrated permanently to edu.br (but would be given sufficient time for the transition).

As of August 2021, Registro.br reports 1207 domains registered directly under .br.

Predefined domains 
As of August 2021, there are 140 different second-level domains of .br under which custom domains can be registered, and they are divided into six categories: "Generic", "Cities", "Universities", "Professionals", "Natural persons" and "Legal persons". They are the following:

Special second-level domains 
From 2000 until 2009, during election cycles, electoral candidates could register domains under CAN.br, with the format [name][number].can.br – where the name is the registered candidate name, and the number is the identification number for that candidate in the election (related to the party's identification number). The second-level domain was in a category of its own, called "natural persons, special".

As an example, during the 2004 elections for mayor of Aracaju:

 Marcelo Déda had the website deda13.can.br (his surname and Worker's Party's identification number, 13);
 Susana Azevedo had the website susana23.can.br (her first name and Cidadania's identification number, 23);
 Jorge Alberto had the website jorgealberto15.can.br (his name and MDB's identification number, 15).

Domains were free for registered candidates. Additionally, domains were automatically cancelled at the end of the first round if the candidate lost, and remaining ones were cancelled after the end of the second round.

No new .can.br domains have been registered since 2009.

Agencies 
There are multiple agencies registered directly under .br, as second-level domains, that aren't higher education or research institutions. The following list might not be exhaustive:

Most of these agencies are subsidiaries of CGI.br and, as such, they follow a similar corporate identity. The "logos" are combinations of the names of the agencies with the logo for .br, all of which are simply typed out with Brandon Schoech (Tepid Monkey)'s freeware font "Qhytsdakx":

Networks 
There are multiple networks registered directly under .br, usually of academic nature. Again, this list may not be exhaustive:

See also
 Internet in Brazil
 .bom
 .rio

References

External links
 IANA .br whois information
 Registro.br : Brazil's official registry administrator
 Second-level domain statistics for .br
 .br Registration
 TepidMonkey's archived website (source of the font used in the logos, "Qhytsdakx")

Communications in Brazil
Country code top-level domains
Internet in Brazil
Computer-related introductions in 1989

sv:Toppdomän#B